Cui Qi (born 26 February 1993) is a Chinese footballer currently playing as a defender for Zibo Qisheng in China League Two.

Club career
In 2018, Cui was loaned to China League Two side Baotou Nanjiao. He returned to the club, under the new name Inner Mongolia Caoshangfei, on a permanent basis in 2020.

Career statistics

Club
.

Notes

References

1993 births
Living people
People from Zhoukou
Footballers from Henan
Chinese footballers
Association football defenders
China League Two players
Chongqing F.C. players
Guizhou F.C. players
Shanghai Shenhua F.C. players
Inner Mongolia Caoshangfei F.C. players
Shaanxi Chang'an Athletic F.C. players
Chinese expatriate footballers
Chinese expatriate sportspeople in Spain
Expatriate footballers in Spain